Calamoschoena nigripunctalis is a moth in the family Crambidae. It was described by George Hampson in 1919. It is found in Uganda.

References

Endemic fauna of Uganda
Moths described in 1919
Schoenobiinae